The Girl Most Likely To... is a 1973 American black comedy television film directed by Lee Philips and written by Joan Rivers and Agnes Gallin. It stars Stockard Channing and Ed Asner. The film premiered on November 6, 1973, as part of the ABC Movie of the Week. The story has plot elements similar to the 1950 film The Second Face.

Plot
Miriam Knight is an intelligent but unattractive young woman who is treated disrespectfully by those around her due to her homely appearance. She has changed colleges five times in three years. In that time, she has taken a lot of different classes but is still unable to find a boyfriend. At her new college, things go from bad to worse. She is either ignored or humiliated by almost everyone. Miriam finally lands the lead in a play, but her jealous roommate, knowing that Miriam is allergic to roses, places some in a box during Miriam's performance, causing Miriam to sneeze herself into humiliation. She tearfully speeds away from the college campus, but is involved in an automobile accident.

Miriam requires reconstructive surgery on her face. Once the bandages are removed, they reveal a brunette bombshell. From the moment she steps outside the room in the hospital, she makes it her mission to exact vengeance on all those who did her wrong by killing them, one by one.

Miriam uses her new good looks (which make her unrecognizable as the "old" Miriam) and the skills that she acquired in many of her classes to commit the crimes. A police detective, Ralph Varone, who had a brief encounter with the "old" Miriam, solves the crimes committed by the "new" Miriam and discovers her motive. Varone falls in love with Miriam, becoming the only man to love her for her mind. They marry with Miriam in custody, preparing to serve a lengthy jail sentence.

Cast

References

External links
 
 

1973 television films
1973 comedy films
1973 films
1970s American films
1970s black comedy films
1970s English-language films
1970s serial killer films
ABC Movie of the Week
American black comedy films
American comedy television films
American films about revenge
American serial killer films
Films about bullying
Films directed by Lee Philips
Films scored by Bernardo Segall
Films set in universities and colleges
Films with screenplays by Joan Rivers
Works about plastic surgery